The canton of Le Cœur de Béarn is an administrative division of the Pyrénées-Atlantiques department, southwestern France. It was created at the French canton reorganisation which came into effect in March 2015. Its seat is in Mourenx.

It consists of the following communes:
 
Abidos
Abos
Angous
Araujuzon
Araux
Audaux
Bastanès
Bésingrand
Biron
Bugnein
Cardesse
Castetnau-Camblong
Castetner
Charre
Cuqueron
Dognen
Gestas
Gurs
Jasses
Laà-Mondrans
Lacommande
Lagor
Lahourcade
Lay-Lamidou
Loubieng
Lucq-de-Béarn
Maslacq
Méritein
Monein
Mourenx
Nabas
Navarrenx
Noguères
Ogenne-Camptort
Os-Marsillon
Ozenx-Montestrucq
Parbayse
Pardies
Préchacq-Navarrenx
Rivehaute
Sarpourenx
Sauvelade
Sus
Susmiou
Tarsacq
Viellenave-de-Navarrenx
Vielleségure

References

Cantons of Pyrénées-Atlantiques